Admiral Sir Henry William Urquhart McCall,  (11 June 1895 – 23 March 1980) was a senior Royal Navy officer who commanded the Reserve Fleet from 1951 until his retirement in 1953.

Naval career
McCall joined the Royal Navy as midshipman in the cruiser HMS Hyacinth at the Cape of Good Hope in 1908. He served in the First World War as sub-lieutenant in the steamship HMS Daffodil from 1915, as Executive Officer in the destroyer  in the Grand Fleet from 1916 and as Executive Officer in the destroyer  in the Grand Fleet from 1918. He was present at the Scuttling of the German fleet in Scapa Flow in 1919. He became commanding officer of the destroyer  in the Mediterranean Fleet in 1932 and naval attaché at Buenos Aires in Argentina in 1938.

McCall served in the Second World War as commanding officer of the cruiser  from 1940, as Chief of Staff to Admiral Sir Percy Noble who was Head of the British Naval Delegation to Washington D. C. from 1943, and as commanding officer of the battleship  in South East Asia in 1944.

McCall became Senior British Naval Officer in the Middle East in 1946, Flag Officer, Destroyers in the Mediterranean Fleet in 1949 and Vice Admiral commanding the Reserve Fleet 1950, before retiring in 1953.

References

1895 births
1980 deaths
Companions of the Distinguished Service Order
Companions of the Order of the Bath
Knights Commander of the Order of the British Empire
Knights Commander of the Royal Victorian Order
People from Largs
Royal Navy admirals
Royal Navy personnel of World War I
Royal Navy personnel of World War II